Dickens is a crater on Mercury. It has a diameter of 78 kilometers. Its name was adopted by the International Astronomical Union (IAU) in 1976. Dickens is named for the English novelist Charles Dickens, who lived from 1812 to 1870.

The crater Keats is north of Dickens, Han Kan is to the northeast, and Martí is to the southwest.

References

Impact craters on Mercury
Charles Dickens